The name Nathan has been used for two tropical cyclones in the Western Pacific Ocean and two in the Australian region.

Western Pacific Ocean:
Tropical Storm Nathan (1990), entered the China Sea
Tropical Storm Nathan (1993), crossed Japan

Australian region:
Cyclone Nathan (1998), approached the Queensland coast
Cyclone Nathan (2015), hit the Arnhem Land

See also
 Tropical cyclones named Nate